Natasza Zylska, (born Natasza Zygelman - December 13, 1933 – March 29, 1995) was a Polish singer of Jewish heritage. She was one of the most popular singers in Poland in the 1950s. Her most famous song, Kasztany, is covered by Irena Santor and Edyta Górniak. Zylska also sang songs by Hanna Skalska and Kazimierz Szemioth. In 1963, Zylska emigrated to Israel.

References 

1933 births
1995 deaths
Jewish women singers
20th-century Polish Jews
Musicians from Vilnius
People from Wilno Voivodeship (1926–1939)
20th-century Polish women singers
Polish emigrants to Israel